The FV434 is the Armoured Repair Vehicle variant of the British Army's FV430 series of armoured fighting vehicles. Introduced in the 1960s primarily as a means of quickly changing Chieftain MBT power packs in the field, it is operated by the Royal Electrical and Mechanical Engineers (REME). It is still used by the REME.

Description
Officially designated FV434 Carrier, Maintenance, Full Tracked, the FV434's primary role is to repair disabled and damaged vehicles, but it also has a limited recovery capability. It is fitted with a crane (capable of lifting up to 3 tons) to assist its work in repairing armoured and un-armoured vehicles. The FV434 is capable of changing other FV430 series power packs, however, it is unable to handle the power pack the British Army's Challenger 2 main battle tank - this is done by Challenger armoured recovery vehicle in forward areas and soft skin repair vehicles in base areas.

In addition to the crane, the FV434 is fitted with a fold-away work bench to the rear of the vehicle. Like its personnel carrier version, it is capable of amphibious operations with the aid of a flotation screen. Once in the water, it is propelled by its tracks at up to 5.6 km/h. It is crewed by four soldiers: commander, driver and two fitters.

Examples on display
The REME Museum of Technology has an example of a FV434 demonstrating the change of a power-pack on a FV432.

The Norfolk Tank Museum has a restored and running example currently on display.

See also
Armoured recovery vehicles
List of FV series military vehicles
REME

References

Citations

Janes Military Vehicles and Logistics

Bibliography
Foss, C. and Gander, T. Jane's Military Vehicles and Ground Support Equipment (1984)

External links
REME Museum of Technology
Janes Military Vehicles and Logistics

Amphibious armoured fighting vehicles
Cold War armoured fighting vehicles of the United Kingdom
Tracked armoured fighting vehicles
Military recovery vehicles
Royal Electrical and Mechanical Engineers
Military vehicles introduced in the 1960s